Gwilym Prys Davies, Baron Prys-Davies (8 December 1923 – 28 March 2017) was a Welsh Labour politician. He was a pioneer of the use of the Welsh language for official purposes, and in 1982 became the first member of the House of Lords to take the oath of allegiance in Welsh.

Biography
Gwilym Prys Davies was born in the village of Llanegryn, in Meirionnydd, Wales. He served in the Royal Navy during the Second World War, on North Atlantic Convoys. After the war was over, he went to the University College of Wales, Aberystwyth to study law. This is where he met Llinos Evans, to whom he would be married for over fifty years until her death in 2010. By 1956 he had qualified as a solicitor and was working at a legal practice in Pontypridd, pioneering the use of the Welsh language in the courts.

His political career started with Plaid Cymru, before he moved to Labour after the Welsh Socialist Republican Movement, of which he was a founder and strong supporter, failed to influence party policy. He also believed that change could be better made by working within a larger, less nationalistic, party that was in power, rather than a smaller, more nationalistic, party that was not in power. He was always a strong advocate of devolution for Wales. He was the Labour candidate in the 1966 Carmarthen by-election but lost to the first Plaid Cymru member to be a member of parliament, a historic event in Welsh politics. He went on to support devolutionsists within the Labour Party with the aim of securing "political responsibility for Welsh life".

He became a member of the Welsh Hospitals' Board and ensured that the parents of the victims of the 1966 Aberfan disaster were represented in courts by Desmond Ackner QC, a well-renowned and able barrister. After John Morris, now Lord Morris of Aberavon, was appointed Secretary of State for Wales, he appointed Gwilym Prys Davies as his special advisor. He was appointed an Officer of the Most Venerable Order of the Hospital of St John of Jerusalem (OStJ) in 1969.

He was appointed as a life peer in 1982, and was the first member of the House of Lords to take his oath in Welsh. Before becoming a peer he changed his name from Gwilym Prys Davies to Gwilym Prys Prys-Davies by Deed Poll to enable him to take the title Baron Prys-Davies, of Llanegryn in the County of Gwynedd. The intention of the change was to keep the name Prys, which was said to be due his being to a distant relation of the clergyman and poet Edmund Prys (1542/3 – 1623). In the Lords, he was opposition frontbench spokesperson for Health between 1983 and 1987, for Northern Ireland between 1982 and 1993 and for the Welsh Office between 1987 and 1997. He retired from the House of Lords on 23 May 2015.

References

External links 
 Gwilym Prys-Davies Papers at the National Library of Wales

Sources
Parliament.uk Biography
Hansard
BBC News Obituary
 

1923 births
2017 deaths
Welsh republicans
Labour Party (UK) life peers
People from Gwynedd
Welsh Labour politicians
Welsh-speaking politicians
Officers of the Order of St John
Royal Navy sailors
Plaid Cymru politicians
Life peers created by Elizabeth II